Tremayne Marcell Joiner (born June 8, 1995), also known as Tre Capital, is an American rapper and singer from Los Angeles. He is the founder and a member of the hip hop collective Deluxe or D.lx.

Early life 
Tre is the oldest son of rapper Xzibit. He began to practice freestyling on a daily basis while attending high school. He briefly attended West Los Angeles College before withdrawing in 2014.

Career

2013–2015: Early career and Gundam EP series 
Tre's first solo full-length project, a 15-track mixtape titled Heaven Isn't Far From Here, was initially released on December 1, 2013 – the project was later re-released on November 16, 2015, via SoundCloud. The mixtape features guest vocals from American rapper Trae tha Truth and production contributions from Black Milk, Hit-Boy and DJ Dahi.

His second project, the first installment in a series of projects conceptually themed and inspired by Gundam, is a six-track EP titled Gundam Pt. I or Gundam Part 1. It was released via SoundCloud on September 21, 2014 – the EP features guest vocals from Canadian rapper Sean Leon and production contributions from Eestbound and Wondagurl.

His third project, a follow up to Gundam Pt. I, is a six-track EP titled Gundam Pt. II or Gundam Part 2 – it was released on June 8, 2015. The EP features guest vocals from English rapper Danny Seth and fellow D.lx member Mathaius Young. The entire project was produced by Wondagurl and Eestbound – they are also both credited as executive producers for the project. A record titled 'Critical Thinking' from the project was featured during the tenth episode of OVO Sound Radio.

2016–2017: I Can't Die Yet and We Must Do Better 
Zane Lowe premiered Comeback of the Century – the first single from Joiner's fourth project – in December 2015 alongside Pusha T. The 11-track studio album titled I Can't Die Yet, was released on March 15, 2016. The album features production contributions from Eestbound, Cardo, Charlie Heat, Sango, Stwo and WondaGurl – there are no guest vocal contributions on the final published version of the album. The album later went on to be recognized by Just Blaze, Ab-Soul and Noah "40" Shebib.

Joiner was a candidate for the tenth pick on XXL's "2016 Freshman Class" – he subsequently lost the nomination to Lil Yachty.

Joiner's fifth project, an 11-track studio album titled We Must Do Better, was released on January 7, 2017. The album features vocals from SiR, TĀLĀ, Ismael & Martin $ky. The album also features production contributions from Eestbound, Haze Banga, Michael Seven, VNSN, and frequent collaborator WondaGurl.

2018–present: Various projects and Hero 
Following the release of We Must Do Better, Joiner began working as an intern for G.O.O.D. Music. On December 7, 2017, Tre announced via Twitter that a studio album titled Hero, would be released in 2018. His sixth project, an eight-track collaborative EP with Haze Banga titled New Tier, was released on February 28, 2018. His seventh project, a six-track collaborative EP with Mathaius Young titled Burnin' Castles, was released on May 30, 2018.

Tre has performed a wide variety of showcases including SOB'S NY, SXSW, headlining "The Mint" theatre 2x, Troubadour, El Rey, Santa Ana Observatory, Reggies in Chicago, Union, A3C & opening up for Legends on the Art of Rap Tour at the Palladium.

Blue Eyes White Dragon Flow was the first record recorded for the album (executive produced by frequent DONDA designer Joe Perez) while assisting and helping along sessions for the entire remainder of 2017 continuing into summer of 2018. The cover for Hero is designed by Alex Haldi. The listening session for Hero was held at No Name Studios June 28, 2018. The album features vocals from Anthony Kilhoffer & Mathaius Young. The album features production from Anthony Kilhoffer, WondaGurl, HazeBanga, S1, Josh Simons, Michael Seven, Nabeyin, VohnBeatz, Idle Kid & more — available on all streaming services.

Influences 
Joiner has stated that he is influenced by his father Xzibit, Tupac Shakur, J. Cole, Earl Sweatshirt, Black Milk, Kanye West, Jay-Z, Kendrick Lamar and Lil Wayne.

Discography

Studio albums

Mixtapes

Extended plays

Singles

References

External links 
 Official website

1995 births
Living people
Rappers from Los Angeles
21st-century American rappers
Singer-songwriters from California